Between May 10 and May 13, 1931, over one hundred convents and other religious buildings were burnt by anarchists and other extreme left anticlericalists in Spain during riots that started in Madrid and spread throughout the country.

On May 10, a right-wing group played a recording of the monarchist Marcha Real by an open window in the Calle de Alcalá while a large crowd were returning from the Buen Retiro Park. Some members of the crowd were enraged, and protests the following day swept across Spain. While some members of the new government of the Spanish Republic wanted to restore order, others in the cabinet resisted. According to the canonical narrative Manuel Azaña allegedly stated that "all the convents of Spain are not worth the life of a single Republican".

References

1931 in Spain
Second Spanish Republic
1931 riots
May 1931 events
Anti-Catholicism